Hans Hartleb (born 6 November 1951) is a German skier. He competed in the Nordic combined event at the 1972 Winter Olympics.

References

External links
 

1951 births
Living people
German male Nordic combined skiers
Olympic Nordic combined skiers of East Germany
Nordic combined skiers at the 1972 Winter Olympics
Sportspeople from Thuringia